Shadows of the Past is a 1991 Canadian suspense thriller TV film directed by Gabriel Pelletier and starring Nicholas Campbell and Erika Anderson.

Plot
After a mysterious car accident, photo journalist Jackie Delaney (Erika Anderson) wakes up in the hospital
with amnesia. Haunted by flashbacks of the accident, she checks out of the hospital determined to unravel the mystery
behind her recent past. Who was in the car with her, and who is following her now? After an attempt on her life, Jackie is assigned police protection and detective Sean MacFern (Nicholas Campbell) enters her life. Together, they will solve a mystery that goes beyond a mere accident and that enters the shady world of
internationals arms smuggling.

External links

1991 television films
1991 films
English-language Canadian films
1991 thriller films
Canadian thriller films
Films directed by Gabriel Pelletier
Canadian thriller television films
1990s Canadian films